This list details the privately operated ferry routes traversing lakes and rivers of inland British Columbia, Canada. This list does not include coastal routes operated by BC Ferries and/or its subcontractors.

List of current routes 
The current inland ferries in BC are as follows:

List of former routes 
former inland ferry routes in BC were as follows:

References

External links
UBC Sessional Papers Collection - Contains annual reports that include details about former ferries 

Water transport in British Columbia